Leo Väisänen (born 23 July 1997) is a Finnish professional footballer who plays as a centre back for Austin FC in Major League Soccer and the Finland national team. Väisänen was born in Helsinki, Finland. He began his senior club career playing for HJK and RoPS, before signing with Den Bosch at age 21 in 2018.

Väisänen made his international debut for Finland in June 2019, at the age of 21.

Club career

HJK

Väisänen made his Veikkausliiga debut for HJK on 14 April 2016 in a game against RoPS.

RoPS

In November 2016 he signed a two-year contract with RoPS. He made his debut on 12 April 2017, playing the full 90 minutes of a 6–2 defeat at Inter Turku.

Den Bosch

In August 2018 Väisanen was signed by the Dutch side FC Den Bosch. Väisänen made his debut for Den Bosch on 21 September 2018, in a match against Almere; he was substituted on the 61st minute for Stefano Beltrame.

Elfsborg
On 12 January 2020 Väisänen joined Swedish club IF Elfsborg on a 3.5-year contract.

Austin FC
On 4 January 2023, it was announced Väisänen had signed with Major League Soccer side Austin FC on a three-year deal.

International career
He made his Finland national football team debut on 11 June 2019 in a Euro 2020 qualifier against Liechtenstein, as an 86th-minute substitute for Jukka Raitala.

Väisänen was called up for the UEFA Euro 2020 pre-tournament friendly match against Sweden on 29 May 2021. On 1 June 2021 Markku Kanerva published the national team for the UEFA Euro 2020 tournament and Väisänen was named as one of the defenders. On 12 June 2021 Väisänen came in as a 90th minute substitute for Jukka Raitala in a UEFA Euro 2020 match against Denmark.

Personal life

He is the younger brother of Sauli Väisänen. Their mother Anna-Liisa Tilus-Väisänen is a television presenter for Yle and Miss World 1984 semi-finalist.

Career statistics

Club

International

.

Honours

Club

Klubi 04
Kakkonen Eastern Group: 2015

Individual
Veikkausliiga Team of the Year: 2018

References

External links

 IF Elfsborg official profile
 Leo Väisänen – SPL competition record 
  
 
 
 

1997 births
Living people
Footballers from Helsinki
Association football defenders
Finnish footballers
Finnish expatriate footballers
Finland youth international footballers
Finland under-21 international footballers
Finland international footballers
Klubi 04 players
Helsingin Jalkapalloklubi players
PK-35 Vantaa (men) players
Rovaniemen Palloseura players
Käpylän Pallo players
FC Den Bosch players
IF Elfsborg players
Austin FC players
Veikkausliiga players
Kakkonen players
Eerste Divisie players
UEFA Euro 2020 players
Finnish expatriate sportspeople in the Netherlands
Finnish expatriate sportspeople in Sweden
Finnish expatriate sportspeople in the United States
Expatriate footballers in the Netherlands
Expatriate footballers in Sweden
Expatriate soccer players in the United States